Hestiochora furcata is a moth of the family Zygaenidae. It is found in Australia from southern Queensland through New South Wales to Victoria and South Australia.

The length of the forewings is 7.5–11 mm for males and 8–12.5 mm for females. Adults are on wing from November to February, possibly in one generation per year.

External links
Australian Faunal Directory
Zygaenid moths of Australia: a revision of the Australian Zygaenidae

Procridinae
Moths described in 2005